Piercetown, or Piercestown, is a village in County Wexford, Ireland.

References

Towns and villages in County Wexford